Relea Ferina Saet (born November 24, 1984) is a Filipina volleyball player. She currently plays for the Petro Gazz Angels in the Premier Volleyball League.

Career
UAAP

Saet was a member of DLSU Lady Spikers collegiate women's University and plays as a Setter in the UAAP. She made her debut as a Setter of the team in 2003.

In 2004, she won best Setter award in UAAP Season 67 and Shakey's V-League and her team DLSU became the champion of the 2 tournaments.

In 2005, she won best Setter award again in UAAP Season 68 and Shakey's V-League 1st and 2nd Conference  and her team DLSU became the champion of the 3 tournaments.

Shakey's V-League/PVL

In 2013, she played in Cagayan Valley Lady Rising Suns and her team became the champion that year.

In 2017, she played in Cignal HD Spikers (women's team).

In 2018, she was signed by the Petro Gazz Angels.

Clubs
  PCSO Bingo Milyonaryo Puffins - (2013)
  Cagayan Valley Lady Rising Suns - (2014-2015)
  Kia Forte - (2015)
  Cignal HD Spikers - (2017)
  Petro Gazz Angels - (2018-present)

Awards

Individual

Collegiate

Clubs

References

1984 births
Living people
Filipino women's volleyball players
Setters (volleyball)